Esomus malabaricus is a species of cyprinid endemic to Kerala in India.

References

Freshwater fish of India
Fish described in 1867
Esomus